The Mayor of Kauai is the chief executive officer of the County of Kauai in the state of Hawaii.  The mayor has municipal jurisdiction over the islands of Kauai and Ni’ihau. Derek Kawakami was elected on November 6, 2018, as the mayor of Kauai over JoAnn A. Yukimura, who was Kauai's mayor from 1988 to 1992, with 15,857 votes out of 40,323 registered voters in the County of Kauai.  The Mayor of Kauai is the successor of the Royal Governors of Kauai of the Kingdom of Hawaii.

The most recent previous mayor of Kauai, Bryan J. Baptiste, served from 2002 until his death on June 22, 2008. Bill "Kaipo" Asing was sworn as acting mayor on July 17, 2008, until a special election could be held to fill the remaining two years of Baptiste's term.

Bernard Carvalho was elected on November 4, 2008, to complete the remaining two years of Baptiste's unexpired term.

List of mayors of Kauai

References

External links
 " Kaua'i County 2008 Election Report," Kaua'i County Elections Division January 24, 2009.
 Kauai mayor Bryan Baptiste dies  June 23, 2008.